The Slovak Extraliga 2002–03 was the tenth regular season of the Slovak Extraliga, the top level of professional ice hockey in Slovakia.

Regular season

Final standings

Key - GP: Games played, W: Wins, OTW: Over time wins, T: Ties, OTL: Over time losses, L: Losses, GF: Goals for, GA: Goals against, PTS: Points.

Playoffs

Playoff tree

Scoring Leaders
Regular season

Key - GP: Games played, G: Goals, A: Assists, PTS: Points.

2002–03 All Star Team

External links
 Slovak Ice Hockey Federation

2002-03
Slovak
2002–03 in European ice hockey leagues